Shiroishi may refer to:

 Shiroishi, Miyagi
 Shiroishi, Saga
 Shiroishi-ku, Sapporo